Grand-Mère is a settlement and former municipality in central Quebec, Canada on the Saint-Maurice River. As a result of the municipal reorganization in Quebec which took effect at the beginning of 2002, Grand-Mère now forms part of the City of Shawinigan. Population in 2001 was 13,179.

History
Grand-Mère was founded in 1898.  Like some of its neighbouring towns, it owes its economic origins to the St-Maurice river on which it is located. A major hydroelectric dam that was built on the river in 1916 was one of the oldest and largest Hydro-Québec generating stations. The dam was replaced by a larger dam in 2004. The abundance of relatively inexpensive electricity led to the development of industry, primarily based on the production of paper. Logs which were used for the paper pulp were floated downstream on the St-Maurice to the paper mill from more northerly areas. The mill, which has changed ownership over the decades, has had a lasting impact on the town, from the creation of its award-winning golf course to the construction of several of the town's historic buildings.

The surrounding area consists of forested hills, lakes, and flat plains and farms, with much glacial activity still evident. The Mauricie region in which Grand-Mère is located has been struggling economically for decades, and boasts some of the most inexpensive real estate in Canada.

The name of the town comes from a rock formation that resembles an old woman with a hair bun at the base of her head ("grand-mère" is French for grandmother). The formation formerly stood in the rapids of the Saint-Maurice River adjacent to the town. When the hydroelectric dam was built, the formation was moved in 1916 and rebuilt. It is now in a small park overlooking the St-Maurice River, at the corner of 4e and 5e Avenues.

The area's biggest attraction is La Mauricie National Park.

Education
There are five public schools. All of them are affiliated to the Commission scolaire de l'Énergie school board.

Mayors
From 1898 to 2001, Grand-Mère had its own mayor and its own city council.  The mayors were:

See also
Shawinigate

Footnotes

References
 Commission de toponymie du Québec - Grand-Mère

Neighbourhoods in Shawinigan
Former municipalities in Quebec
Former towns in Canada
Populated places disestablished in 2002